Rakovec is a village and a municipality in Croatia in the Zagreb County. According to the 2011 census, there are 1,252 inhabitants in the municipality, 98% of which are Croats.

Settlements are:
 Baničevec
 Brezani
 Dropčevec
 Dvorišće
 Goli Vrh
 Hruškovec
 Hudovo
 Kolenica
 Lipnica
 Mlaka
 Rakovec
 Valetić

References

Populated places in Zagreb County
Municipalities of Croatia